The Daily Reporter is an American daily newspaper published Mondays through Saturdays in Greenfield, Indiana. It is owned by Home News Enterprises.

It covers the city of Greenfield and several nearby communities in Hancock County, Indiana. In addition to the daily newspaper, the Daily Reporter produces two weekly newspapers in Hancock County, the Fortville/McCordsville Reporter and the New Palestine Reporter. Home News also owns a third weekly in neighboring Madison County, The Times-Post.

History
The Greenfield Daily Reporter was founded in 1908, although through a merger one year later it also incorporates the history of The Evening Star, founded August 1, 1904.

Robert N. Brown, whose grandfather had started The Republic in Columbus and who himself had founded the Daily Journal in Franklin, both in communities south of Indianapolis, purchased the Greenfield Daily Reporter in 1973, a year after the death of Dorothea Spencer, whose family had started the paper in 1908.

He said at the time that his goals for the newspaper would be "reflecting the total image of a community in news coverage, to serve community betterment, and to provide counsel in its editorials as public conscience."

The newspaper has stayed in the family ever since; its current owner, Home News Enterprises, is a partnership of various Brown family members set up in 1994.

Home News expanded its holdings east of Indianapolis in June 2007, with the purchase of two weeklies in Madison County, the Lapel Post and The Pendleton Times, which it combined into the Times-Post of Pendleton.

References

External links 
 
 

Hancock County, Indiana
Newspapers published in Indiana
Mass media in Indianapolis
Publications established in 1908
1908 establishments in Indiana